Phichit Hospital is the main hospital of Phichit Province, Thailand. It is classified under the Ministry of Public Health as a general hospital. It has a CPIRD Medical Education Center which trains doctors for the Faculty of Medicine of Naresuan University.

History 
The construction of Phichit Hospital was started in 1950 and the hospital opened for outpatients in 1953 with one building capable of 30 beds. Capability for patient admission was available the following year. In 2004, the hospital made an agreement to train medical students and act as a clinical teaching hospital for the Faculty of Medicine, Naresuan University and about 10 students are trained here annually under the Collaborative Project to Increase Production of Rural Doctors (CPIRD) program. The hospital received HA and HPH accreditation in 2005.

See also 
 Healthcare in Thailand
 Hospitals in Thailand
 List of hospitals in Thailand

References 

 Article incorporates material from the corresponding article in the Thai wikipedia.

Hospitals in Thailand
Phichit province